J.S. Anna Liddiard (29 April 1773 – October 1819) was an Irish romantic poet whose work draws on themes of patriotism, Irish culture and history, landscape, and human relations.

Life
Jane Susannah Anna Wilkinson was born in County Meath. She was the daughter of Sir Henry Wilkinson, of Corballis. She married Rev. William Liddiard (1773–1841) on 12 February 1798, an Anglican clergyman of Wiltshire who was a poet, artist and retired army officer. He was the vicar of Culmullen, Co. Meath from 1807-1810, and then in the united parish of Knockmark from 1810-1831. Liddiard had one son, Henry Liddiard, born in 1800. He inherited the rectory of Knockmark. Liddiard's death date is not officially recorded, but she appears to predeceased her husband, as he remarried in 1822. She appears to have died at Corballis, with The Bristol Mercury reported her death as 30 October.

Poetry and writing
Liddiard dedicated her book of Poems to her husband, published in Dublin in 1809. The couple moved to Bath in 1811, living there for 2 years. Whilst there she published The Sgelaighe or A tale of old in 1811, supposedly drawing on an old Irish manuscript. She describes her return from Bath to Ireland in Kenilworth and Farley Castle (1813). This book is addressed to the Ladies of Llangollen, whom she visited. In 1816, she published a tale in verse called Evening after the battle, which was published along with her husband's Mont St Jean, both pieces are based around the battle of Waterloo. An anonymous work Mount Leinster (1819) is usually ascribed to Liddiard, but could have been written by her husband.

Liddiard's verse is patriotic and romantic, in particular her poem Addressed to Albion and Conrade. Both Liddiard and her husband advocated for religious tolerance, with the work Mount Leinster blaming the 1798 Rebellion on the Penal Laws.

References 

1773 births
1819 deaths
People from County Meath
18th-century Irish poets
18th-century Irish writers
18th-century Irish women writers
19th-century Irish poets
19th-century Irish writers
19th-century Irish women writers